The Wuling Hongguang S1 is a compact MPV manufactured by SAIC-GM-Wuling between 2015 and 2017 in China, and since 2017 in Indonesia as the Wuling Confero. A commercial van version was introduced in Indonesia in 2018 as the Wuling Formo and Wuling Formo S for the passenger variant, while a 2-door pickup version was introduced in Indonesia in 2023 as the Wuling Formo Max.

Overview

China
The Hongguang S1 was launched in China on 20 August 2015 with three trim levels (Standard, Comfort and Luxury) and positioned above the Hongguang and Hongguang S MPVs. On 20 April 2016, a new trim level with different exterior design was launched as Hongguang S1 Exclusive and based on the Luxury trim. Due to low sales, Hongguang S1 was discontinued around early 2017 and it was replaced by Hongguang S3.

Indonesia 
In Indonesia, the Hongguang S1 is sold by SGMW Indonesia as the Wuling Confero, where it was launched to the public on 2 August 2017. Two variants were launched; Confero that based on the pre-2016 Chinese market Hongguang S1 and Confero S that based on the Hongguang S1 Exclusive. The Confero has gray coloured interior while Confero S has more luxurious dual tone beige-black coloured interior.

A commercial van variant based on Confero with 1.2-litre petrol engine called Wuling Formo, which is available in panel/blind van and 8-seater passenger van/wagon ("minibus"), was launched on 7 November 2018. It has gray or brown coloured interior option.

The name "Confero" is derived from Latin word for "togetherness", while "Formo" means "to form" in the same language.

A new variant called Confero S ACT (Automatic Clutch Transmission) with Schaeffler-developed 6-speed semi-automatic transmission was introduced on 22 April 2019. Minor changes also appeared for all Confero S variants, such as brand new black coloured interior, day/night view center mirror, driver seat high adjuster, emergency stop signal and electric retract mirrors, also the deletion of rear fog lights and HDMI port.

The Confero S received another changes on 10 March 2021. The changes including new sporty front-end design and also the deletion of engine cover (except for ACT trim), headlamps leveling, analog clock (except for L and ACT trims), third row USB port and variable valve timing (except for ACT trim). Facelifted Confero with Formo's front grille and smoked headlights was announced on 3 June 2021. On 22 October 2021, passenger variant of Formo also received the same facelift treatment as Confero. This model is renamed to Formo S and also available as 5-seater variant.

In January 2023, the model gained a pickup body style called the Wuling Formo Max. It is powered by the 1.5-litre engine from the Confero.

Gallery

Safety

Sales

References

External links 
 Wuling Hongguang S1 website (China)
 Wuling Confero S website (Indonesia)
 Wuling Confero S ACT website (Indonesia)
 Wuling Formo website (Indonesia)

Hongguang S1
Cars introduced in 2015
2020s cars
Compact MPVs
Vans
ASEAN NCAP small MPVs
Rear-wheel-drive vehicles
Cars of China